Mena (also:) is a Spanish surname that originates as both a Basque and Spanish Sephardic surname.

It is also a given name, Mena. The Meena tribe of India is also spelled as Mena.

Basque meaning
Found in the valley of Mena (Alava, which today is Burgos), with branches in Bilbao and in Dima (Biscay) and it appears to have also moved from there into Navarre; regions now part of Spain. It appears to mean mineral or a vein of mineral deposits, however at least one author, Lopez Mendizabal, holds that its meaning is pastoral. A variant of the surname is Menaca, with the '-ka' suffix representing "place of", as in "place of Mena", equivalent to the Spanish "de Mena".

Notable people with the name

Carlos Mena, Spanish countertenor
Eugenio Mena, Chilean footballer
Gabriel Mena, Spanish poet, composer, musician and singer
Gilberto García Mena, Mexican drug lord
Javiera Mena, Chilean pop singer
Juan de Mena, Spanish Renaissance poet
Juanjo Mena, Spanish conductor
Luis Mena (disambiguation), multiple people
Luis Mena, former President of Nicaragua
Luis Mena Irarrázabal, Chilean footballer
Maria Mena, Norwegian pop singer
Odlanier Mena, Chilean general
Omar Mena, Cuban sprinter
Pedro de Mena, Spanish sculptor in the 17th century

See also
Mena (given name)
Mina (surname)

References

Jewish surnames
Basque-language surnames
Sephardic surnames
Feminine given names
Unisex given names